Dominik Baumgartner (born 20 July 1996) is an Austrian footballer who plays for Wolfsberger AC.

Personal life
Baumgartner's younger brother, Christoph, is also a professional footballer and youth international for Austria.

Career statistics

References

External links

 
 
 Dominik Baumgartner at OEFB

Austrian footballers
Austria youth international footballers
Austria under-21 international footballers
Austrian Football Bundesliga players
2. Liga (Austria) players
Austrian Regionalliga players
1996 births
Living people
SV Horn players
SV Grödig players
FC Wacker Innsbruck (2002) players
VfL Bochum players
Association football defenders
Austrian expatriate footballers
Austrian expatriate sportspeople in Germany
Expatriate footballers in Germany
2. Bundesliga players
People from Horn, Austria
Footballers from Lower Austria